The Vekoma Wooden roller coaster is a model of wooden roller coaster built by Vekoma.

Installations

References

Vekoma
 
Types of roller coaster